Far from Moscow (Russian: Далеко от Москвы) is a 1950 Soviet war drama film directed by Aleksandr Stolper and starring Nikolay Okhlopkov, Lev Sverdlin and Pavel Kadochnikov. It is based on Vasily Azhayev's 1948 novel of the same title. A major production by Mosfilm, it was awarded the Stalin Prize.

Cast
 Nikolay Okhlopkov as Batmanov  
 Lev Sverdlin as Zalkind  
 Pavel Kadochnikov as Kovshov  
 Valerian Kvachadze as Beridze  
 Aleksandr Khanov as Topolev 
 Grigori Kirillov as Grubskiy  
 Tatyana Makhova as Tanya 
 Ivetta Kiselyova as Zhenya 
 Vladimir Vladislavskiy as Liberman  
 Sergei Stolyarov as Pogov  
 Mark Bernes as Umara-Magomet  
 Leonid Kmit as Makhov 
 Stepan Krylov as Solntsev  
 Roza Makagonova  as Zhenya
 Pavel Olenev as Merzlyakov 
 Vladimir Solovyov as Efimov  
 Viktor Bubnov as Karpov  
 Sergei Gurzo as Petya Gudkin  
 P. Ivanov as Genka Pankov 
 Georgi Chernovolenko as Fursov 
 Aleksandr Khvylya as Pisarev 
 Aleksandra Panova as Batmanov's secretary 
 Lyubov Sokolova as Olga Fyodorovna, doctor  
 Yuri Timoshenko as Operator

References

Bibliography 
 Hopf, Ted. Reconstructing the Cold War: The Early Years, 1945-1958. Oxford University Press, 2012.

External links 
 

1950 drama films
1950 films
1950s war drama films
Films based on Russian novels
Films directed by Aleksandr Stolper
1950s Russian-language films
Soviet war drama films